The Taipei Symphony Orchestra (as known as TSO (not to be confused with the Toronto Symphony Orchestra), founded in 1969, is one of the leading orchestras based in Taipei, Taiwan.

In these seasons, TSO works also with European Music directors and conductors, such as Reinhard Goebel, Martin Fischer-Dieskau or Maurice Steger. The orchestra's current Principal Conductor is Gilbert Varga. It was announced in March 2019 that Eliahu Inbal will take over the chief conductor position from August 2019, with a contract of three years.

Overview 
Under the direction of Felix Chen from 1986 to 2003, the Orchestra grew in size and strength, the number of orchestra members increased, and the length of the season expanded. He also broadened the Orchestra's repertoire by introducing new and unfamiliar works from all music styles and periods, while maintaining the highest standard of traditional classical music. For the 2004 season, the Taipei City Government nominated the well-known bassoonist, Chia-Chu Hsu as the General Director.

Taipei Music Festival 
In 1979, Taipei Music Festival, instructed by former Taipei City Mayor Lee Teng-hui, was created to promote cultural activity within the island of Taiwan. Over the years, the festival has been recognized worldwide for its successful performances and international roster of artists, such as the Royal Philharmonic Orchestra, Israel Philharmonic Orchestra, St. Petersburg Philharmonic Orchestra, Russian State Philharmonic Orchestra, Oslo Philharmonic Orchestra, Bamberger Symphoniker, Budapest Symphony Orchestra, Royal Concertgebouw Orchestra, Orchestre Philharmonique de Radio France, and Rundfunk-Sinfonieorchester Berlin.

The annual opera produced by TSO every year is also an important musical event on the island. The TSO has performed such works as La traviata, Faust, Carmen, Turandot, La bohème, Aida, Madama Butterfly, Cavalleria rusticana, Pagliacci, Otello, The Flying Dutchman, and Salome. Recently, the TSO has featured operas by Carl Orff, having performed his Die Kluge in 2016, with a performance of Der Mond in August 2017.

Music directors and principal conductors 
 Teng Chang-kuo (鄧昌國), 1969–1973
 Chen Tun-chu (陳暾初), 1973–1986
 Felix Chen, 1986–2003
 András Ligeti, 2005–2007
 Martin Fischer-Dieskau, 2008–2011
 Gilbert Varga, 2013–2018
 Eliahu Inbal, 2019– 2022

Current members 
As of December 11, 2006.
 General director Hsu Chia-chu
 Deputy director Chen Shu-shi
 Concertmasters Daniel Wei-chung Chiang, Chiang Chih-i

See also 
 List of symphony orchestras in Taiwan

References

External links 
 Taipei Symphony Orchestra Official Website

Taiwanese orchestras
Musical groups established in 1969
1969 establishments in Taiwan